Sarah Palmer may refer to:
Sarah R. Palmer (born 1943), professor of maritime history
Sarah Palmer (Twin Peaks), a character in television series Twin Peaks
Sarah Palmer (Halo), a character in the Halo video game series
Sarah Palmer, a character in My Bloody Valentine 3D